This article is a list of broadcasters for the National Basketball Association (NBA)'s Brooklyn Nets franchise.

Television

Play by Play
Marty Glickman (1970–1972)
Steve Albert (1972–1990)
Leandra Reilly (February 14 and March 2, 1988, Alternate Play by Play for Steve Albert)
Spencer Ross (1990–1995)
Ian Eagle (Primary 1995–2005, 2011–Present, Secondary 2005–2011)
Mike Crispino (Secondary 1995–2005)
Matt Loughlin (Secondary 1995–2005)
Marv Albert (2005–2011)
Clarence Freeman (Secondary 2011–Present)

Color Analyst
Bob Gibson (1970–1972)
Mike DiTomasso (1972–1981)
Phil Jackson (1981–1982)
Bill Raftery (Primary 1982–2002)
Bob Goldsholl (Secondary 1982–1987)
Jim Spanarkel (Secondary 1987–2002, Secondary 2005–2019)
Kelly Tripucka (2002–2005)
Mark Jackson (2005–2008)
Mike Fratello (2008–2017)
Greg Anthony (Tertiary 2012–2013)
Donny Marshall (Tertiary 2013–2016)
Sarah Kustok (Tertiary 2015–2017, Primary 2017–Present)
Richard Jefferson (Secondary 2019-Present)

Broadcast Outlets

Terrestrial
WPIX (1970–1973, 2021)
WWOR-TV (1973–1992; 2005–2019, 2022)
WNYW (1992–1997)
WPXN-TV (1997–1998)
WLNY-TV (1999–2005)

Cable
Cablevision Sports 3/SportsChannel/Fox Sports (Net) New York (1976–2002)
YES Network (2002–Present)

Radio

Play by Play
Marty Glickman (1970–1972)
Al Albert (1972–1974)
Dom Valentino (1974–1975)
John Sterling (1975–1981)
Joe Tait (1981–1982)
Mike Zimet (1982–1983)
Mel Proctor (1983–1985)
Neil Funk (1985–1987)
Howard David (1987–1994)
Ian Eagle (1994–1995)
Steve Albert (1995–1996)
Bob Papa (1996–2001)
Chris Carrino (2001–Present)
Craig Carton (March 8, 2013)

Color Analyst
Bob Gibson (1970–1972)
Mike DiTomasso (1972–1987)
Jim Spanarkel (primary 1987–1993)
Tim Bassett (secondary 1987–1988)
Mike O'Koren (secondary 1988–1993, 1993–1999)
Albert King (1999–2001)
Kelly Tripucka (2001–2002)
Tim Capstraw (2002–Present)
Boomer Esiason (March 8, 2013)

Flagship Station
WHN (1970–1974)
WMCA (1974–1979)
WVNJ (1979–1983)
WNBC (1983–1986)
WNEW (1986–1994)
WPAT and WEVD (1993–1994)
WQEW (1994–1996)
WOR (1996–2004)
WFAN (2004–Present)

Notes
When Leandra Reilly called a 1988 game on SportsChannel New York, she became the first woman to do play-by-play of an NBA game.
On March 8, 2013, Craig Carton and Boomer Esiason, the morning hosts on the Nets' radio flagship station, WFAN, worked as the play-by-play announcer and color commentator, respectively, for the Nets' contest against the Washington Wizards at Barclays Center.

See also 
 List of current National Basketball Association broadcasters

References

Brooklyn Nets
SportsChannel
Fox Sports Networks
YES Network
Bally Sports
Broadcasters